Traveling Wilburys Vol. 3 is the second and final studio album by the Traveling Wilburys, a group consisting of George Harrison, Jeff Lynne, Bob Dylan and Tom Petty. It was released on October 29, 1990, as the follow-up to their 1988 debut, Traveling Wilburys Vol. 1. The band members again adopted pseudonyms for their contributions, using new names from the fictitious Wilbury brothers.

History
Though it was their second release, the album was mischievously titled Vol. 3 by George Harrison.  According to Jeff Lynne, "That was George's idea.  He said, 'Let's confuse the buggers.

As the dynamics within the band had shifted with Roy Orbison's death, the four remaining members all adopted new Wilbury pseudonyms: Spike (George Harrison), Clayton (Jeff Lynne), Muddy (Tom Petty) and Boo (Bob Dylan). With Harrison and Lynne producing again, the sessions were undertaken in the spring of 1990. An additional track, a cover of "Nobody's Child", was recorded and released in June 1990 as a charity single in aid of Olivia Harrison's Romanian Angel Appeal. The song was also the title track of a multi-artist fundraising album compiled by the Harrisons, Nobody's Child: Romanian Angel Appeal. Traveling Wilburys Vol. 3 was dedicated to the memory of "Lefty Wilbury" (Roy Orbison).

Released in October 1990, the album was less positively received than Vol. 1, yet still saw a fair measure of success. In the United States, "She's My Baby" (with guest guitarist Gary Moore) and "Inside Out" became radio hits, charting at number 2 album rock and number 16 album rock, respectively. The album peaked at number 14 in the UK and number 11 in the US, where it was certified platinum by the RIAA.

Comparing the two Wilburys albums, a reviewer in The New York Times wrote in November 1990: "The superstar pop group stays close to 50's and 60's rock roots, drawing on blues, doo-wop, rockabilly and Buddy Holly. But their second album is faster, jokier, lighter and meaner than the first." Rolling Stone described the blending of the four participants' musical styles as "seemingly effortless", and said that the album showed they continued to enjoy their collaboration. In the years following Vol. 3, there was speculation about further Wilbury releases. Since Harrison was viewed as the de facto leader of the group, his death in November 2001 ended the possibility of any future projects.

When Harrison's distribution deal with Warner Bros. expired in 1995, ownership of his Dark Horse Records catalog and the two Wilburys albums reverted to him, and the albums went out of print.  On June 12, 2007, Vol. 1 and Vol. 3 were reissued by Rhino Records as The Traveling Wilburys Collection, packaged together with bonus tracks and a DVD.

Track listing

Personnel
Traveling Wilburys
Clayton Wilbury (Jeff Lynne) – acoustic and electric guitars, bass, keyboards, lead and backing vocals
Spike Wilbury (George Harrison) – acoustic, electric and slide guitars, mandolin, sitar, lead and backing vocals
Boo Wilbury (Bob Dylan) – acoustic guitar, harmonica, lead and backing vocals
Muddy Wilbury (Tom Petty) – acoustic guitar, lead and backing vocals

Additional personnel
Buster Sidebury (Jim Keltner) – drums, percussion
Jim Horn – saxophones
Ray Cooper – percussion
Ken Wilbury (Gary Moore) – lead guitar on "She's My Baby"
Eric Idle (as Prof. "Tiny" Hampton) - liner notes

Engineered by
Richard Dodd

Charts

Weekly charts

Year-end charts

Certifications

References

1990 albums
Traveling Wilburys albums
Albums produced by George Harrison
Albums produced by Jeff Lynne
Warner Records albums
Albums recorded at FPSHOT